This is a list of law enforcement agencies in the state of Iowa.

According to the US Bureau of Justice Statistics' 2008 Census of State and Local Law Enforcement Agencies, the state had 392 law enforcement agencies employing 5,830 sworn police officers, about 195 for each 100,000 residents.

Federal Agencies
 Office of the United States Marshal for the Northern District of Iowa
 Office of the United States Marshal for the Southern District of Iowa
 Department of Veterans Affairs

State agencies 
 Iowa Department of Corrections
 Division of Parole
 Iowa Department of Natural Resources Enforcement
 Iowa Department of Public Safety
 Iowa State Division of Criminal Investigation
 Iowa State Division of Narcotics Enforcement
 Iowa State Fire Marshal
 Iowa State Patrol
 Iowa Department of Transportation Motor Vehicle Enforcement

County agencies 

 Adair County Sheriff's Office
 Adams County Sheriff's Office
 Allamakee County Sheriff's Office
 Appanoose County Sheriff's Office
 Audubon County Sheriff's Office
 Benton County Sheriff's Office
 Black Hawk County Sheriff's Office
 Boone County Sheriff's Office
 Buchanan County Sheriff's Office
 Buena Vista County Sheriff's Office
 Butler County Sheriff's Office
 Calhoun County Sheriff's Office
 Carroll County Sheriff's Office
 Cass County Sheriff's Office
 Cedar County Sheriff's Office
 Cerro Gordo County Sheriff's Office
 Cherokee County Sheriff's Office
 Chickasaw County Sheriff's Office
 Clarke County Sheriff's Office
 Clay County Sheriff's Office
 Clayton County Sheriff's Office
 Clinton County Sheriff's Office
 Crawford County Sheriff's Office
 Dallas County Sheriff's Office
 Davis County Sheriff's Office
 Decatur County Sheriff's Office
 Delaware County Sheriff's Office
 Des Moines County Sheriff's Office
 Dickinson County Sheriff's Office
 Dubuque County Sheriff's Office
 Emmet County Sheriff's Office
 Fayette County Sheriff's Office
 Floyd County Sheriff's Office

 Franklin County Sheriff's Office
 Fremont County Sheriff's Office
 Greene County Sheriff's Office
 Grundy County Sheriff's Office
 Guthrie County Sheriff's Office
 Hamilton County Sheriff's Office
 Hancock County Sheriff's Office
 Hardin County Sheriff's Office
 Harrison County Sheriff's Office
 Henry County Sheriff's Office
 Howard County Sheriff's Office
 Humboldt County Sheriff's Office
 Ida County Sheriff's Office
 Iowa County Sheriff's Office
 Jackson County Sheriff's Office
 Jasper County Sheriff's Office
 Jefferson County Sheriff's Office
 Johnson County Sheriff's Office
 Jones County Sheriff's Office
 Keokuk County Sheriff's Office
 Kossuth County Sheriff's Office
 Lee County Sheriff's Office
 Linn County Sheriff's Office
 Louisa County Sheriff's Office
 Lucas County Sheriff's Office
 Lyon County Sheriff's Office
 Madison County Sheriff's Office
 Mahaska County Sheriff's Office
 Marion County Sheriff's Office
 Marshall County Sheriff's Office
 Mills County Sheriff's Office
 Mitchell County Sheriff's Office

 Monona County Sheriff's Office
 Monroe County Sheriff's Office
 Montgomery County Sheriff's Office
 Muscatine County Sheriff's Office
 O'Brien County Sheriff's Office
 Osceola County Sheriff's Office
 Page County Sheriff's Office
 Palo Alto County Sheriff's Office
 Plymouth County Sheriff's Office
 Pocohontas County Sheriff's Office
 Polk County Sheriff's Office
 Pottawattamie County Sheriff's Office
 Poweshiek County Sheriff's Office
 Ringgold County Sheriff's Office
 Sac County Sheriff's Office
 Scott County Sheriff's Office
 Shelby County Sheriff's Office
 Sioux County Sheriff's Office
 Story County Sheriff's Office
 Tama County Sheriff's Office
 Taylor County Sheriff's Office
 Union County Sheriff's Office
 Van Buren County Sheriff's Office
 Wapello County Sheriff's Office
 Warren County Sheriff's Office
 Washington County Sheriff's Office
 Webster County Sheriff's Office
 Winnebago County Sheriff's Office
 Winneshiek County Sheriff's Office
 Woodbury County Sheriff's Office
 Worth County Sheriff's Office
 Wright County Sheriff's Office

Municipal agencies 

Ackley Police Department
 Afton Police Department 
Algona Police Department
 Altoona Police Department 
 Ames Police Department
 Anamosa Police Department
 Ankeny Police Department
 Armstrong Police Department 
 Arnolds Park Police Department
 Asbury Police Department
 Atlantic Police Department
 Aurelia Police Department
 Belle Plaine Police Department
 Bettendorf Police Department
 Blue Grass Police Department
 Boone Police Department
 Britt Police Department
 Burlington Police Department
 Camanche Police Department
Carroll Police Department 
 Cedar Falls Police Department
 Cedar Rapids Police Department
 Centerville Police Department
 Clarinda Police Department
 Clinton Police Department
 Clive Police Department
 Coralville Police Department
 Council Bluffs Police Department
 Cresco Police Department 
 Davenport Police Department
 Desoto Police Department
 Des Moines Police Department
 Dubuque Police Department
 Durant Police Department
 Dysart Police Department
 Dunkerton Police Department
Eldridge Police Department
Estherville Police Department
 Fairbank Police Department
Fairfield Police Department
 Farley Police Department
 Farnhamville Police Department
 Fayette Police Department
 Forest City Police Department
 Fort Dodge Police Department
 Fort Madison Police Department
 Garner Police Department
 Grinnell Police Department
 Hiawatha Police Department
 Iowa City Police Department
 Jefferson Police Department 
 Jesup Police Department
 Keokuk Police Department
 Knoxville Police Department
 Le Mars Police Department
 Lisbon Police Department
Maquoketa Police Department

 Marion Police Department
 Marshalltown Police Department
 Mason City Police Department
 Monona Police Department
 Mitchellville Police Department
 Monticello Police Department
Mount Pleasant Police Department
 Mount Vernon Police Department
 Muscatine Police Department
New Hampton Police Department
 New London Police Department
 New Sharon Police Department
 Newton Police Department
 North Liberty Police Department
 Norwalk Police Department
 Oelwein Police Department 
 Ogden Police Department
 Okoboji Police Department
 Osage Police Department 
 Osceola Police Department 
 Ottumwa Police Department
 Pella Police Department
 Perry Police Department
 Pleasant Hill Police Department
 Prairie City Police Department 
 Princeton Police Department
 Red Oak Police Department
 Robins Police Department
Rock Valley Police Department
 Shellsburg Police Department
 Shenandoah Police Department
 Sioux City Police Department
 Spencer Police Department
Spirit Lake Police Department
 State Center Police Department 
 Storm Lake Police Department
 Story City Police Department
 Tama Police Department
 Tipton Police Department
 Toledo Police Department
 University Heights Police Department
 Urbana Police Department
 Urbandale Police Department
 Van Meter Police Department
 Vinton Police Department
 Washington Police Department
 Waterloo Police Department
Waverly Police Department 
 Webster City Police Department
 West Burlington Police Department
 West Des Moines Police Department
 West Liberty Police Department
 West Union Police Department
 Wilton Police Department
 Windsor Heights Police Department
 Winterset  Police Department

College and University agencies 

 Iowa State University Police Department
 University of Iowa Police Department
 University of Northern Iowa Police Department

Other agencies 
 Meskwaki Nation Police Department
 Eastern Iowa Airport Public Safety Department

Disbanded/Defunct agencies 
Center Point Police Department
Coggon Police Department
Iowa Capitol Police
Palo Police Department
Springville Police Department

Notes of Interest 
All Iowa Sheriff's Departments use the same markings and graphics on their patrol vehicles aside from each county having its respective name on the patrol vehicle before the word "County" under the "SHERIFF" door markings.  All road deputies in the state also wear the same brown uniforms.  All counties have the same shoulder patches with the county name at the top, a 7 point gold star with "IOWA" in the middle, and "SHERIFF" at the bottom.  Polk County Deputies may sometimes be seen with Silver 7-point stars on their uniforms.  Many years ago they were sent the wrong color patches due to a shipping or order mistake and haven't bothered to fix the 'tradition' in the years since.

References

Iowa

Law enforcement agencies